Jim Nesich (born February 22, 1966) is a retired American professional ice hockey player. He was selected by the Montreal Canadiens in the 10th round (116th overall) of the 1984 NHL Entry Draft.

Awards and honors

References

External links

1966 births
Living people
American men's ice hockey centers
Cape Breton Oilers players
Fredericton Canadiens players
Kalamazoo Wings (1974–2000) players
Los Angeles Ice Dogs players
Montreal Canadiens draft picks
Sherbrooke Canadiens players
Verdun Junior Canadiens players
Verdun Juniors players
Worcester IceCats players
Ice hockey players from Michigan
Sportspeople from Dearborn, Michigan
HDD Olimpija Ljubljana players